Richard Trim  (22 December 1931 – 21 September 2020) was a British radar engineer who developed technology used in air traffic control systems.

References

1931 births
2020 deaths
Officers of the Order of the British Empire
Queen's Awards for Enterprise
People from Hackney, London
Radar pioneers
20th-century British engineers
20th-century British inventors